

Tallest Structures

This is a list of the tallest structures in India.

South of INS Kattabomman, there are 2 radio masts with an umbrella antenna situated at 8.378479 N 77.744043 E and 8.375069 N 77.755834 E, which may have a height between 450 and 500 metres.

Timeline of tallest structures of India

See also
 List of tallest buildings in India
 List of tallest buildings and structures in the Indian subcontinent
 List of tallest buildings in different cities in India
 List of the tallest statues in India
 List of tallest structures in the world

References

External links
 Skyscraperpage.com diagram

India
 
Indian superlatives
Tallest